Speed skiing was a demonstration sport at the 1992 Winter Olympics. The venue was in Les Arcs, about 60 km from the host city, Albertville. Michael Prufer, a 31-year-old medical doctor from Savoie, improved his own 1988 world record by 5.558 km/h.  Philippe Goitschel, the nephew of French ski champion Marielle Goitschel, was second and the American Jeffrey Hamilton was third. The competition was, however, marred by the death of Nicolas Bochatay from Switzerland, who died while free skiing the morning of the finals.

Men's event

Women's event

References
Official Olympic Report - Albertville 1992

Discontinued sports at the Winter Olympics
1992 Winter Olympics events
Olympics
Skiing at the Winter Olympics
Men's events at the 1992 Winter Olympics
Women's events at the 1992 Winter Olympics